Sydney Business School may refer to:

University of Sydney Business School, Sydney, Australia
University of Wollongong Sydney Business School, Sydney, Australia